Catholics in Alliance for the Common Good (CACG) is a non-partisan, Catholic, non-profit 501(c)(3) organization in the United States, which according to its website aims to promote "the fullness of the Catholic social tradition in the public square". The organization was founded in 2005 by Alexia Kelley and Tom Perriello. It was mentioned in the Podesta emails as an example of an organization created to support progressive Catholic values.

See also

 Social justice
 Christian left
 Political Catholicism

References

External links
  (Archive)
 

American Christian political organizations
Christianity and politics in the United States
Christianity and political ideologies
Catholicism-related controversies
Catholic organizations established in the 21st century
21st-century Catholicism
501(c)(3) organizations
Liberalism in the United States
Liberal Catholicism